The 2008 North Carolina Tar Heels baseball team represented University of North Carolina at Chapel Hill in the 2008 NCAA Division I baseball season. The Tar Heels played their home games at USA Baseball National Training Complex. The team was coached by Mike Fox in his 10th year as head coach at North Carolina.

The Tar Heels won the Cary Regional and the Cary Regional Super Regional to advance to the College World Series, where they were defeated by the Fresno State Bulldogs.

The team played the season at the USA National Training Complex while Boshamer Stadium was being renovated.

Roster

Schedule

|-
! style="" | Regular Season
|-

|-
! bgcolor="#DDDDFF" width="3%" | #
! bgcolor="#DDDDFF" width="7%" | Date
! bgcolor="#DDDDFF" width="14%" | Opponent
! bgcolor="#DDDDFF" width="25%" | Site/Stadium
! bgcolor="#DDDDFF" width="5%" | Score
! bgcolor="#DDDDFF" width="5%" | Overall Record
! bgcolor="#DDDDFF" width="5%" | ACC Record
|- align="center" bgcolor="#ccffcc"
| 1 || February 22 || at Florida Atlantic || FAU Baseball Stadium • Boca Raton, Florida || 7–1 || 1–0 || –
|- align="center" bgcolor="#ccffcc"
| 2 || February 23 || at Florida Atlantic || FAU Baseball Stadium • Boca Raton, Florida || 14–13 || 2–0 || –
|- align="center" bgcolor="#ccffcc"
| 3 || February 24 || at Florida Atlantic || FAU Baseball Stadium • Boca Raton, Florida || 8–7 || 3–0 || –
|- align="center" bgcolor="#ffcccc"
| 4 || February 26 ||  || USA Baseball National Training Complex • Cary, North Carolina || 6–8 || 3–1 || –
|- align="center" bgcolor="#ccffcc"
| 5 || February 28 || at  || Winthrop Ballpark • Rock Hill, South Carolina || 6–1 || 4–1 || –
|- align="center" bgcolor="#ccffcc"
| 6 || February 29 || vs  || Winthrop Ballpark • Rock Hill, South Carolina || 8–1 || 5–1 || –
|-

|-
! bgcolor="#DDDDFF" width="3%" | #
! bgcolor="#DDDDFF" width="7%" | Date
! bgcolor="#DDDDFF" width="14%" | Opponent
! bgcolor="#DDDDFF" width="25%" | Site/Stadium
! bgcolor="#DDDDFF" width="5%" | Score
! bgcolor="#DDDDFF" width="5%" | Overall Record
! bgcolor="#DDDDFF" width="5%" | ACC Record
|- align="center" bgcolor="#ccffcc"
| 7 || March 1 || vs  || Winthrop Ballpark • Rock Hill, South Carolina || 6–2 || 6–1 || –
|- align="center" bgcolor="#ccffcc"
| 8 || March 2 || vs St. John's || Winthrop Ballpark • Rock Hill, South Carolina || 4–2 || 7–1 || –
|- align="center" bgcolor="#ccffcc"
| 9 || March 4 ||  || USA Baseball National Training Complex • Cary, North Carolina || 10–2 || 8–1 || –
|- align="center" bgcolor="#ffcccc"
| 10 || March 8 || at  || Jack Coombs Field • Durham, North Carolina || 4–13 || 8–2 || 0–1
|- align="center" bgcolor="#ccffcc"
| 11 || March 8 || at Duke || Jack Coombs Field • Durham, North Carolina || 9–3 || 9–2 || 1–1
|- align="center" bgcolor="#ccffcc"
| 12 || March 9 || at Duke || Jack Coombs Field • Durham, North Carolina || 9–0 || 10–2 || 2–1
|- align="center" bgcolor="#ffcccc"
| 13 || March 11 ||  || USA Baseball National Training Complex • Cary, North Carolina || 4–11 || 10–3 || 2–1
|- align="center" bgcolor="#ccffcc"
| 14 || March 12 ||  || USA Baseball National Training Complex • Cary, North Carolina || 10–2 || 11–3 || 2–1
|- align="center" bgcolor="#ccffcc"
| 15 || March 14 ||  || USA Baseball National Training Complex • Cary, North Carolina || 11–1 || 12–3 || 3–1
|- align="center" bgcolor="#ccffcc"
| 16 || March 15 || Virginia Tech || USA Baseball National Training Complex • Cary, North Carolina || 6–5 || 13–3 || 4–1
|- align="center" bgcolor="#ccffcc"
| 17 || March 16 || Virginia Tech || USA Baseball National Training Complex • Cary, North Carolina || 6–0 || 14–3 || 5–1
|- align="center" bgcolor="#ccffcc"
| 18 || March 18 ||  || USA Baseball National Training Complex • Cary, North Carolina || 7–0 || 15–3 || 5–1
|- align="center" bgcolor="#ccffcc"
| 19 || March 19 || Princeton || USA Baseball National Training Complex • Cary, North Carolina || 8–2 || 16–3 || 5–1
|- align="center" bgcolor="#ffcccc"
| 20 || March 21 || at  || Shipley Field • College Park, Maryland || 2–4 || 16–4 || 5–2
|- align="center" bgcolor="#ccffcc"
| 21 || March 22 || at Maryland || Shipley Field • College Park, Maryland || 14–1 || 17–4 || 6–2
|- align="center" bgcolor="#ccffcc"
| 22 || March 23 || at Maryland || Shipley Field • College Park, Maryland || 19–1 || 18–4 || 7–2
|- align="center" bgcolor="#ccffcc"
| 23 || March 25 ||  || USA Baseball National Training Complex • Cary, North Carolina || 12–6 || 19–4 || 7–2
|- align="center" bgcolor="#ccffcc"
| 24 || March 26 ||  || USA Baseball National Training Complex • Cary, North Carolina || 13–2 || 20–4 || 7–2
|- align="center" bgcolor="#ccffcc"
| 25 || March 28 ||  || USA Baseball National Training Complex • Cary, North Carolina || 5–2 || 21–4 || 8–2
|- align="center" bgcolor="#ffcccc"
| 26 || March 29 || NC State || USA Baseball National Training Complex • Cary, North Carolina || 6–8 || 21–5 || 8–3
|-

|-
! bgcolor="#DDDDFF" width="3%" | #
! bgcolor="#DDDDFF" width="7%" | Date
! bgcolor="#DDDDFF" width="14%" | Opponent
! bgcolor="#DDDDFF" width="25%" | Site/Stadium
! bgcolor="#DDDDFF" width="5%" | Score
! bgcolor="#DDDDFF" width="5%" | Overall Record
! bgcolor="#DDDDFF" width="5%" | ACC Record
|- align="center" bgcolor="#ccffcc"
| 27 || April 1 ||  || USA Baseball National Training Complex • Cary, North Carolina || 4–1 || 22–5 || 8–3
|- align="center" bgcolor="#ccffcc"
| 28 || April 2 ||  || USA Baseball National Training Complex • Cary, North Carolina || 7–0 || 23–5 || 8–3
|- align="center" bgcolor="#ccffcc"
| 29 || April 4 ||  || USA Baseball National Training Complex • Cary, North Carolina || 8–1 || 24–5 || 9–3
|- align="center" bgcolor="#ccffcc"
| 30 || April 6 || Georgia Tech || USA Baseball National Training Complex • Cary, North Carolina || 10–4 || 25–5 || 10–3
|- align="center" bgcolor="#ffcccc"
| 31 || April 6 || Georgia Tech || USA Baseball National Training Complex • Cary, North Carolina || 1–4 || 25–6 || 10–4
|- align="center" bgcolor="#ffcccc"
| 32 || April 8 ||  || USA Baseball National Training Complex • Cary, North Carolina || 0–2 || 25–7 || 10–4
|- align="center" bgcolor="#ccffcc"
| 33 || April 9 ||  || USA Baseball National Training Complex • Cary, North Carolina || 5–0 || 26–7 || 10–4
|- align="center" bgcolor="#ccffcc"
| 34 || April 11 || at Clemson || Doug Kingsmore Stadium • Clemson, South Carolina || 8–2 || 27–7 || 11–4
|- align="center" bgcolor="#ccffcc"
| 35 || April 12 || at Clemson || Doug Kingsmore Stadium • Clemson, South Carolina || 4–3 || 28–7 || 12–4
|- align="center" bgcolor="#ccffcc"
| 36 || April 13 || at Clemson || Doug Kingsmore Stadium • Clemson, South Carolina || 8–4 || 29–7 || 13–4
|- align="center" bgcolor="#ccffcc"
| 37 || April 15 || at UNC Greensboro || UNCG Baseball Stadium • Greensboro, North Carolina || 14–3 || 30–7 || 13–4
|- align="center" bgcolor="#ccffcc"
| 38 || April 16 ||  || USA Baseball National Training Complex • Cary, North Carolina || 5–4 || 31–7 || 13–4
|- align="center" bgcolor="#ccffcc"
| 39 || April 18 ||  || USA Baseball National Training Complex • Cary, North Carolina || 12–3 || 32–7 || 14–4
|- align="center" bgcolor="#ccffcc"
| 40 || April 19 || Boston College || USA Baseball National Training Complex • Cary, North Carolina || 6–0 || 33–7 || 15–4
|- align="center" bgcolor="#ccffcc"
| 41 || April 20 || Boston College || USA Baseball National Training Complex • Cary, North Carolina || 8–2 || 34–7 || 16–4
|- align="center" bgcolor="#ccffcc"
| 42 || April 22 || at Charlotte || Robert and Mariam Hayes Stadium • Charlotte, North Carolina || 17–0 || 35–7 || 16–4
|- align="center" bgcolor="#ccffcc"
| 43 || April 23 ||  || USA Baseball National Training Complex • Cary, North Carolina || 10–5 || 36–7 || 16–4
|- align="center" bgcolor="#ccffcc"
| 44 || April 25 || Florida State || USA Baseball National Training Complex • Cary, North Carolina || 11–4 || 37–7 || 17–4
|- align="center" bgcolor="#ffcccc"
| 45 || April 26 || Florida State || USA Baseball National Training Complex • Cary, North Carolina || 5–13 || 37–8 || 17–5
|- align="center" bgcolor="#ccffcc"
| 46 || April 27 || Florida State || USA Baseball National Training Complex • Cary, North Carolina || 2–1 || 38–8 || 18–5

|-
! bgcolor="#DDDDFF" width="3%" | #
! bgcolor="#DDDDFF" width="7%" | Date
! bgcolor="#DDDDFF" width="14%" | Opponent
! bgcolor="#DDDDFF" width="25%" | Site/Stadium
! bgcolor="#DDDDFF" width="5%" | Score
! bgcolor="#DDDDFF" width="5%" | Overall Record
! bgcolor="#DDDDFF" width="5%" | ACC Record
|- align="center" bgcolor="#ccffcc"
| 47 || May 6 ||  || USA Baseball National Training Complex • Cary, North Carolina || 9–2 || 39–8 || 18–5
|- align="center" bgcolor="#ccffcc"
| 48 || May 7 || North Florida || USA Baseball National Training Complex • Cary, North Carolina || 11–5 || 40–8 || 18–5
|- align="center" bgcolor="#ccffcc"
| 49 || May 9 || at  || Davenport Field at UVA Baseball Stadium • Charlottesville, Virginia || 9–3 || 41–8 || 19–5
|- align="center" bgcolor="#ccffcc"
| 50 || May 10 || at Virginia || Davenport Field at UVA Baseball Stadium • Charlottesville, Virginia || 5–2 || 42–8 || 20–5
|- align="center" bgcolor="#ffcccc"
| 51 || May 11 || at Virginia || Davenport Field at UVA Baseball Stadium • Charlottesville, Virginia || 4–5 || 42–9 || 20–6
|- align="center" bgcolor="#ccffcc"
| 52 || May 13 || Winthrop || Davenport Field at UVA Baseball Stadium • Charlottesville, Virginia || 4–1 || 43–9 || 20–6
|- align="center" bgcolor="#ffcccc"
| 53 || May 15 || at Miami (FL) || Mark Light Field • Coral Gables, Florida || 2–12 || 43–10 || 20–7
|- align="center" bgcolor="#ccffcc"
| 54 || May 16 || at Miami (FL) || Mark Light Field • Coral Gables, Florida || 10–6 || 44–10 || 21–7
|- align="center" bgcolor="#ccffcc"
| 55 || May 17 || at Miami (FL) || Mark Light Field • Coral Gables, Florida || 12–11 || 45–10 || 22–7
|-

|-
! style="" | Postseason
|-

|-
! bgcolor="#DDDDFF" width="3%" | #
! bgcolor="#DDDDFF" width="7%" | Date
! bgcolor="#DDDDFF" width="14%" | Opponent
! bgcolor="#DDDDFF" width="25%" | Site/Stadium
! bgcolor="#DDDDFF" width="5%" | Score
! bgcolor="#DDDDFF" width="5%" | Overall Record
! bgcolor="#DDDDFF" width="5%" | ACC Record
|- align="center" bgcolor="#ffcccc"
| 56 || vs May 21 || vs Virginia || Baseball Grounds of Jacksonville • Jacksonville, Florida || 7–8 || 45–11 || 22–7
|- align="center" bgcolor="#ccffcc"
| 57 || vs May 23 || vs  || Baseball Grounds of Jacksonville • Jacksonville, Florida || 2–0 || 46–11 || 22–7
|- align="center" bgcolor="#ffcccc"
| 58 || vs May 24 || vs Florida State || Baseball Grounds of Jacksonville • Jacksonville, Florida || 6–9 || 46–12 || 22–7
|-

|-
! bgcolor="#DDDDFF" width="3%" | #
! bgcolor="#DDDDFF" width="7%" | Date
! bgcolor="#DDDDFF" width="14%" | Opponent
! bgcolor="#DDDDFF" width="25%" | Site/Stadium
! bgcolor="#DDDDFF" width="5%" | Score
! bgcolor="#DDDDFF" width="5%" | Overall Record
! bgcolor="#DDDDFF" width="5%" | ACC Record
|- align="center" bgcolor="#ccffcc"
| 59 || vs May 30 || vs  || USA Baseball National Training Complex • Cary, North Carolina || 16–8 || 47–12 || 22–7
|- align="center" bgcolor="#ccffcc"
| 60 || vs May 31 || vs  || USA Baseball National Training Complex • Cary, North Carolina || 5–1 || 48–12 || 22–7
|- align="center" bgcolor="#ccffcc"
| 61 || vs June 1 || vs UNC Wilmington || USA Baseball National Training Complex • Cary, North Carolina || 7–3 || 49–12 || 22–7
|-

|-
! bgcolor="#DDDDFF" width="3%" | #
! bgcolor="#DDDDFF" width="7%" | Date
! bgcolor="#DDDDFF" width="14%" | Opponent
! bgcolor="#DDDDFF" width="25%" | Site/Stadium
! bgcolor="#DDDDFF" width="5%" | Score
! bgcolor="#DDDDFF" width="5%" | Overall Record
! bgcolor="#DDDDFF" width="5%" | ACC Record
|- align="center" bgcolor="#ccffcc"
| 62 || vs June 7 || vs Costal Carolina || USA Baseball National Training Complex • Cary, North Carolina || 9–4 || 50–12 || 22–7
|- align="center" bgcolor="#ccffcc"
| 63 || vs June 8 || vs Costal Carolina || USA Baseball National Training Complex • Cary, North Carolina || 14–4 || 51–12 || 22–7
|-

|-
! bgcolor="#DDDDFF" width="3%" | #
! bgcolor="#DDDDFF" width="7%" | Date
! bgcolor="#DDDDFF" width="14%" | Opponent
! bgcolor="#DDDDFF" width="25%" | Site/Stadium
! bgcolor="#DDDDFF" width="5%" | Score
! bgcolor="#DDDDFF" width="5%" | Overall Record
! bgcolor="#DDDDFF" width="5%" | ACC Record
|- align="center" bgcolor="#ccffcc"
| 64 || June 15 || vs LSU || Johnny Rosenblatt Stadium • Omaha, Nebraska || 8–4 || 52–12 || 22–7
|- align="center" bgcolor="#ffcccc"
| 65 || June 17 || vs Fresno State || Johnny Rosenblatt Stadium • Omaha, Nebraska || 3–5 || 52–13 || 22–7
|- align="center" bgcolor="#ccffcc"
| 66 || June 20 || vs LSU || Johnny Rosenblatt Stadium • Omaha, Nebraska || 7–3 || 53–13 || 22–7
|- align="center" bgcolor="#ccffcc"
| 67 || June 21 || vs Fresno State || Johnny Rosenblatt Stadium • Omaha, Nebraska || 4–3 || 54–13 || 22–7
|- align="center" bgcolor="#ffcccc"
| 68 || June 22 || vs Fresno State || Johnny Rosenblatt Stadium • Omaha, Nebraska || 1–6 || 54–14 || 22–7
|-

|-
|

Awards and honors
Dustin Ackley
First Team All-ACC
Third Team All-American Baseball America
Third Team All-American Collegiate Baseball Newspaper
Second Team All-Atlantic Region American Baseball Coaches Association
College World Series All-Tournament Team

Colin Bates
Freshman All-American Collegiate Baseball Newspaper
First Team Freshman All-American National Collegiate Baseball Writers Association

Tim Federowicz
Second Team All-ACC

Tim Fedroff
First Team All-American American Baseball Coaches Association
First Team All-American Baseball America
Second Team All-American Collegiate Baseball Newspaper
Third Team All-American National Collegiate Baseball Writers Association
First Team All-Atlantic Region American Baseball Coaches Association
College World Series All-Tournament Team
First Team All-ACC

Matt Harvey
Freshman All-American Collegiate Baseball Newspaper
Second Team Freshman All-American National Collegiate Baseball Writers Association

Kyle Seager
Second Team All-American National Collegiate Baseball Writers Association
Third Team All-American Collegiate Baseball Newspaper
Second Team All-Atlantic Region American Baseball Coaches Association
Second Team All-ACC

Alex White
Second Team All-American American Baseball Coaches Association
Third Team All-American Baseball America
Third Team All-American Collegiate Baseball Newspaper
First Team All-Atlantic Region American Baseball Coaches Association
College World Series All-Tournament Team
Atlantic Coast Conference Pitcher of the Year
First Team All-ACC

Rob Wooten
Second Team All-Atlantic Region American Baseball Coaches Association
Second Team All-ACC

References

North Carolina Tar Heels baseball seasons
North Carolina Tar Heels baseball
College World Series seasons
North Carolina